Two Norwegian property laws, which are so ancient that the time of their enactment is lost, govern Norwegian property. These are the Åsetesrett (homestead right), and the Odelsrett (also referred to as allodial right).

These two rights were considered important enough that they were included in the 1814 Constitution of Norway.

See also
 Allodial title
 Udal law
 Odal (rune)

References

 Gjerset, Knut (1917). History of the Norwegian People. MacMillan. 
 

Property law of Norway
Legal history of Norway